The National Commission to review the working of the Constitution (NCRWC) also known as Justice Manepalli Narayana Rao Venkatachaliah Commission was set up by a resolution of the NDA Government of India led by Atal Bihari Vajpayee on 22 February 2000 for suggesting possible amendments to the Constitution of India. It submitted its report in 2002.

Terms of reference of the Commission
The terms of reference given to the Commission stated that the Commission shall examine, in the light of the experience of the past fifty years, as to how best the Constitution  can respond to the changing needs of efficient, smooth and effective system of governance and socio-economic development of modern India within the framework of parliamentary democracy, and to recommend changes, if any, that are required in the provisions of the Constitution without interfering with its 'basic structure' or 'basic features'.

Composition of Commission
The 11-member commission was headed by Retired Chief Justice of India Justice M.N. Venkatachaliah. The other members of the commission were 

 B.P. Jeevan Reddy, Chairman of the Law Commission
 R.S. Sarkaria, Former Judge of the Supreme Court of India
 K.Punnayya, Former Judge of Andhra Pradesh High Court
 Soli Sorabjee, Attorney-General of India
 K. Parasaran, Former Attorney-General of India
 Subhash C. Kashyap, Former Secretary-General of Lok Sabha
 C.R. Irani (Chief Editor & Managing Director of the Statesman)
 Abid Hussain, Former Ambassador of India to the USA
 Sumitra Kulkarni, Former Member of Parliament)
 P. A. Sangma (Former Speaker of Lok Sabha)

Report
The commission was asked to complete its work and make recommendations within one year. However, after three extensions, the Commission submitted its report on 31 March 2002. The report is bulky one, comprising 1979 pages in two-volumes was received by Law and Justice Minister Arun Jaitley. Volume I contains the recommendations while Volume II (divided in Books 1, 2 & 3) consists of detailed consultation papers, background papers, details of deliberations and the report of its drafting and editorial committee dividing into three books.

Volume I
Introduction 1
Basic Approach and Perspective
Fundamental Rights, Directive Principles and Fundamental Duties
Electoral Processes and Political Parties
Parliament and State Legislatures
Executive and Public Administration
The Judiciary
Union-State Relations
Decentralization and Devolution
Pace of Socio-Economic Change
Summary of Recommendations

Volume II

Book 1
Gazette Notifications
Advisory Panels
Consultation Papers
Enlargement of Fundamental Rights
Pace of Socio-Economic Change under the Constitution
Literacy in the context of the Constitution of India
Social Security and Employment
Effectuation of Fundamental Duties of Citizens
Review of the Working of Political Parties specially in relation to Elections and Reform Options
Review of Election Law, Processes and Reform Options
Immunity of Legislators: What do the words ‘in respect of anything said or any vote given by him’ in article 105(2) signify?
Efficacy of Public Audit System in India: C&AG
Probity in Governance
Liability of State in Tort
Superior Judiciary
All India Judicial Service

Book 2
Consultation Papers (Contd.)
Financial Autonomy of the Indian Judiciary
Constitutional Mechanism for the settlement of Inter-State Disputes
Treaty-making power under our Constitution
The Institution of Governor under the Constitution
Article 356 of the Constitution
Review of the Working of the Constitutional Provisions for Decentralisation (Panchayats)
Decentralization and Municipalities
Empowering and Strengthening local self-government in Cantonments
Empowerment and Strengthening of Panchayat Raj Institutions/ Autonomous District Councils/Traditional tribal governing institutions in North East India

Book 3
Background Papers
Working of Parliament and Need for Reforms
Some ideas in Governance
Concurrent Power of Legislation under List III of the Indian Constitution
Fiscal and Monetary Policies
Barriers to Inter-State Trade & Commerce – The Case of Road Transport
Article 262 and Inter-State Disputes relating to Water
Pace of Socio-Economic Change and Development under the Constitution
List of Organisations/Individuals who sent representations to the Commission
List of Organisations/individuals who responded to the Consultation Papers/Questionnaires issued by the Commission
List of Organisations/Delegations/individuals who interacted with the Commission
List of Seminars sponsored by the Commission
Minutes of meetings of the Commission
Report of the Drafting and Editorial Committee

Implementation
The recommendations have not been accepted by consecutive governments.

References

Constitution of India
Vajpayee administration
2000 in India